Rhipha vivia is a moth in the family Erebidae. It was described by Watson in 1975. It is found in Brazil.

References

Moths described in 1975
Robinsonia (moth)